Daniël Outelet (11 March 1936 – 1970 ??) was Belgium's first great international judo champion. He is the only male Belgian judoka to have won 4 individual European judo titles (1954, 1955, 1957, 1960). With 9 European medals, over an 8-year period, the only other Belgian male judoka to have achieved even more European medals, was Robert Van De Walle a quarter century later. Outelet's premature death at age 34 deprived Belgium of one of a promising teacher and of one of the country's best judo technicians ever.

Career 
Daniël Outelet (together with the late Marcel Clause) is considered as Abe Ichirō's best and most successful judo student. In 1954, in Brussels, he became the first Belgian to win a European judo title in the 1st dan category, after having defeated the Frenchman Briskine. He repeated his success one year later in the 2nd dan category during the 1955 European Championships held in Paris by defeating Douglas Young from Great-Britain.

No European championships were held in 1956, but the next year, in 1957, he won his third title during the Rotterdam European Championships defeating the German Walter Reiter in the 3rd dan category, while also winning a bronze medal in the team championships. He won further bronze medals in the 1958 (Barcelona) and 1959 (Vienna) European championships. In 1960 he won his last European title in Amsterdam defeating the local champion, Dutchman Tony Wagenaar in the 4th dan category, while winning another bronze medal in the team championships. In 1961 he won his last bronze medal (bronze) during the European championships held that year in Milan.

Outelet, however, was unable to obtain the same success during the world championships which were held without weight classes in those days and which favored heavier judoka.

Outelet was the first Belgian judoka to be promoted to the rank of 5th dan. After his competitive career he became the first judo instructor of the newly founded Poseidon-Ryu judo club in Woluwe-Saint-Lambert, a Brussels-Capital Region municipality.

Affected by depression, he committed suicide by hanging in 1970 at the age of 34 after a struggle with what is believed to have been personal problems of a financial nature.

Outelet remains the only male Belgian judoka to have won 4 European titles. He also was a 7-fold national Belgian judo champion. The only other Belgian male judoka to have achieved even more was Robert Van De Walle a quarter century later, with 17 European medals over a 12-year period, an Olympic gold and bronze medal, and 7 World Championship medals (2 silver and 5 bronze).

References 

1936 births
1970 deaths
Belgian male judoka
Judoka trainers
Place of birth missing
1970 suicides
Suicides by hanging in Belgium